Edward James Lodge (born December 3, 1933) is an inactive Senior United States district judge of the United States District Court for the District of Idaho in Boise, Idaho.

Education

Born in Caldwell, Idaho, Lodge graduated from Caldwell High School and briefly attended the University of Notre Dame in South Bend, Indiana. He was a two-time junior college All-American quarterback at Boise Junior College in 1953 and 1954.

Lodge earned his Bachelor of Arts degree from the College of Idaho in Caldwell in 1957, and graduated from the University of Idaho's College of Law in Moscow with a Bachelor of Laws

Early career
Following law school, Lodge practiced law in Idaho from 1962 to 1963. He began his long judicial career in 1963 as a Probate Judge in Canyon County, and in 1965 became the youngest ever appointed to a district court in Idaho, at age 31.

Lodge served for nearly a quarter century as a district judge for the state's Third  District in Canyon County, and presided at the double-murder trial of mountainman Claude Dallas in 1982, a case which received national  He was later appointed as a U.S. Bankruptcy Judge for the District of Idaho from 1988 to 1989.

Federal judicial service
When Judge Marion Callister of the U.S. District Court in Boise took senior status in 1989, Lodge was recommended by Senator Jim McClure to fill the seat.

He served a term as chief judge for the District of Idaho from 1992 to 1999, and was succeeded as chief judge by B. Lynn Winmill. Lodge assumed  senior status

Notable cases

Ruby Ridge
In the spring of 1993, Lodge was the presiding judge in the trial of Randy Weaver and Kevin Harris, defendants in the previous August's Ruby Ridge standoff in northern Idaho.

Five years later in 1998, Lodge was also the presiding judge in the case of Idaho v. Lon T. Horiuchi, which involved the indictment of the FBI sniper who shot three people at Ruby Ridge, killing one. Lodge cited the Supremacy Clause of the U.S. Constitution and dismissed the charges against Horiuchi, which angered many who felt the leniency was unmerited. It was narrowly overturned on appeal (6–5) by the Ninth Circuit in 2001, but the Boundary County prosecutor opted not to pursue the charges brought by his predecessor in 1997.

Sami Al-Hussayen
In 2004, Lodge presided over the trial of Sami Omar Al-Hussayen—accused of recruiting Islamic fanatics into participating in Jihad against the United States. On May 13, he ruled to disallow a defense witness to refer to a blood drive that Hussayen had run after September 11th to help the victims, nor that he had widely condemned the attacks.

Personal
Lodge was the target of a foiled murder plot in 1998. He is married to Patti Anne Lodge, a state senator from Huston in Canyon County.

References

External links

|-

1933 births
Living people
Judges of the United States District Court for the District of Idaho
United States district court judges appointed by George H. W. Bush
Idaho state court judges
20th-century American judges
Boise State Broncos football players
College of Idaho alumni
University of Idaho alumni
People from Caldwell, Idaho
Judges of the United States bankruptcy courts
University of Idaho College of Law alumni
21st-century American judges